Perpetual, meaning "eternal", may refer to:

Christianity 

 Perpetual curacy, a type of Christian priesthood in Anglicanism
 Perpetual virginity of Mary, one of the four Marian dogmas in Catholicism

Finance 
Perpetual bond, a bond that pays coupons forever
Perpetual plc, a British investment management company which became Invesco Perpetual
Perpetual Limited, an Australian diversified financials company
Perpetuity, a perpetual asset

Other 
Perpetual Entertainment, an American software development company
Perpetual Maritime Truce, the treaty defining peaceful relations in the Trucial States, today the United Arab Emirates.
Perpetual motion (disambiguation)
Perpetual Union, a concept in American constitutional law and a feature of the Articles of Confederation, which established the United States as a national entity

See also 
 Perpetua (disambiguation)